Koch is a German surname that means "cook" or "chef".

A–C
 Adam Koch (born 1988), American professional basketball player
 Adolf Koch (1896–1970), German school teacher and leader of the Freikörperkultur
 Alan Koch (baseball) (born 1938), retired American professional baseball player
 Alan Koch (soccer) (born 1975), South African and Canadian football/soccer coach
 Alexander Koch (disambiguation), several people
 Alfred Koch (born 1961), Russian writer, mathematician-economist, and businessman of ethnic German origin
 Amy Koch (born 1971), member of the Minnesota Senate
 Andreas Koch (born 1966), Austrian former footballer
 Anton Koch (disambiguation), several people
 Aubrey Koch (1904–1975), pioneering Australian aviator
 Beat Koch (born 1972), Swiss cross country skier
 Beate Koch (born 1967), former German athlete
 Bernward Koch (born 1957), German composer, pianist and keyboardist
 Berthold Koch (1899–1988), German chess master
 Bill Koch (businessman) (born 1940), William I. "Bill" Koch, America's Cup yachtsman, businessman, son of Fred C. Koch
 Bill Koch (skier) (born 1955), cross-country skier
 Billy Koch (born 1974), Major league baseball relief pitcher
 Blake Koch (born 1985), American race car driver
 Bobby Koch (born 1960), CEO of the Wine Institute
 Carl Koch (director) (1892–1963), German film director and writer
 Carl Koch (architect) (1912–1998), American architect
 Carl Ludwig Koch (1778–1857), German entomologist and arachnologist, father of Ludwig Carl Christian Koch
 Carin Koch (born 1971), Swedish professional golfer
 Cary Koch (born 1986), American professional football wide receiver playing for the Saskatchewan Roughriders
 Cees Koch (athlete) (born 1936), Dutch discus thrower
 Charles Koch (born 1935), heir and CEO of Koch Industries and co-founder of the free-market Cato Institute
 Chris Koch, American film director
 Christiane Koch, German physicist
 Christina Koch (born 1979), American astronaut
 Christof Koch (born 1956), American neuroscientist
 Christopher Koch (1932–2013), Australian novelist
 Ciril Metod Koch (1867–1925), Slovene architect

D–G
 Dagfinn Koch, Norwegian musician
 Dan Koch (born 1983), American musician, lead guitarist and principal songwriter for the indie rock band Sherwood
 Daniel Koch (Swiss physician) (born 1955), Swiss physician
 Daniel Koch (American politician) (1816–1903), Pennsylvania politician
 David Koch (Australian politician) (born 1949), member of the Victorian Legislative Council
 David Koch (television presenter), Australian financial analyst and TV presenter
 David Koch (1940–2019), businessman, 1980 Libertarian Party vice-presidential candidate, heir to Koch Industries, son of Fred C. Koch
 Des Koch (1932–1991), American athlete
 Dieter-Lebrecht Koch (born 1953), German politician
 Dietrich Koch (1916–2002), Oberleutnant der Reserve in the Wehrmacht during World War II
 Dora Koch-Stetter (1881–1968), (aka Dora Stetter), German landscape artist, portrait painter and etcher
 Dorothy Bush Koch (born 1959), daughter of the 41st president of the US, George Herbert Walker Bush
 Ed Koch (1924–2013), 105th mayor of New York City 1978–1989
 Edeltraud Koch, retired German swimmer
 Ehrhardt Koch (1886–1954), German American businessman
 Eleonore Koch (1926–2018), German-born Brazilian artist
 Eric Koch (1919–2018), German-born Canadian author, broadcaster, and professor
 Erich Koch (1896–1986), Gauleiter of East Prussia
 Erik Koch (born 1988), American martial artist
 Erland Koch (1867–1945), German sports shooter
 Fabian Koch (born 1989), Austrian footballer
 Florian Koch (born 1992), German basketball player
 Franz Koch (disambiguation), several people
 Franziska Romana Koch (1748–1796), German operatic soprano
 Fred C. Koch (1900–1967), American chemical engineer and entrepreneur, founder of Koch Industries
 Fred Conrad Koch (1876–1948), American biochemist
 Freddy Koch (1916–1980), Danish film actor
 Frederick R. Koch (born 1933), American collector and philanthropist, son of Fred C. Koch
 Friedrich Koch (1862–1927), German composer
 Friedrich Koch (general) (1879–1961), German general
 Gabriele Koch, German studio potter
 Gaetano Koch (1849–1910), Italian architect
 Gareth Koch (born 1962), Australian classical guitarist
 Gary Koch (born 1952), American professional golfer
 George Koch (1919–1966), American football player
 George W. Koch (1871–1908), American politician
 Georg Koch (born 1972), German football goalkeeper
 Gertrud Koch (1924–2016), German resistance fighter
 Gini Koch, American science fiction, fantasy, and horror writer
 Greg Koch (born 1955), former American football tackle
 Greg Koch (musician) (born June 23, 1966), American musician - guitar player

H–K
 Hans Koch (1893–1945), German lawyer
 Hans Koch (SS man) (1912–1955), German SS-Unterscharführer and member of staff at Auschwitz concentration camp
 Hans-Reinhard Koch (1929–2018), German Roman Catholic prelate
 Harald Koch (born 1969), Austrian badminton player
 Harry Koch (German footballer) (born 1969), German footballer and coach
 Harry Koch (businessman) (1867–1942), Dutch-born American businessman
 Hawk Koch (born 1945), American film producer
 Helge von Koch (1870–1924), Swedish mathematician, originator of the eponymous "Koch snowflake"
 Helmut Koch (conductor) (1908–1975), German conductor, choir leader, broadcasting manager, composer and academic teacher 
 Henny Koch (1854–1925), German children's author and translator
 Henri Koch (disambiguation), several people, including:
 Henri Koch (bobsledder) (born 1904), Luxembourgish bobsledder
 Henriette Koch, Danish sports sailor
 Henry C. Koch (1841–1910), German-American architect
 Herbert Koch (born 1962), German mathematician
 Herman Koch (born 1953), Dutch writer and actor
 Howard E. Koch (1901–1995), American screenwriter
 Howard W. Koch (1916–2001), American film director/producer
 Hugo Koch (1870–1928), Dutch inventor
 Ilse Koch (1906–1967), German personality, "The Bitch of Buchenwald", wife of Karl Otto Koch
 Jan Koch (born 1995), German footballer
 Jerry Koch, American basketball player
 Jesper Koch, Danish composer
 Jim Koch, American brewer, founder of Boston Beer Company
 John Koch, American painter
 Johan Peter Koch, Danish captain and explorer
 Jonathan Koch (disambiguation), several people
 Joseph Koch, American lawyer, politician, and judge
 Joseph Anton Koch, Austrian painter
 Jørgen Hansen Koch, Danish architect
 Julian Koch (born 1990), German football player
 Julius Ludwig August Koch, German psychiatrist
 Julius Koch (1872–1902), exceptionally tall man
 Jurij Koch, Sorbian writer
 Jürgen Koch, Austrian badminton player
 Karen Koch, American ice hockey goaltender
 Karl Koch (disambiguation), several people, including:
 Karl Koch (botanist), German botanist
 Karl-Otto Koch, German first commandant of the Buchenwald concentration camp
 Karl-Rudolf Koch, German geodesist and professor
 Kenneth Koch, American poet
 Klaus Koch, German Old Testament Scholar
 Konrad Koch, German teacher and football pioneer
 Kurt Koch, Swiss Cardinal of the Roman Catholic Church
 Kurt E. Koch, Protestant theologian and writer (best known for books on the occult and on the work of the Holy Spirit)
 Kyle Koch, Canadian football offensive lineman

L–R
 Lauge Koch (1892–1964), Danish expedition leader in Greenland
 Lothar Koch (oboist) (1935–2003), German oboist
 Ludwig Koch (disambiguation), several people, including:
 Ludwig Carl Christian Koch (1825–1908), German entomologist and arachnologist, son of Carl Ludwig Koch
 Ludwig Koch (painter) (1866–1934), Austrian equestrian painter
 Marco Koch (born 1990), German swimmer
 Marianne Koch (born 1931), German actress and physician
 Marita Koch (born 1957), German sprint athlete
 Mariza Koch (born 1944), Greek folk singer
 Markus Koch (born 1963), American football defensive lineman
 Martin Koch (novelist) (1882–1940), Swedish novelist
 Martin Koch (ski jumper) (born 1982), Austrian ski jumper
 Matt Koch (born 1990), American baseball player
 Matthias Koch (born 1988), Austrian football midfielder
 Max Koch (disambiguation), several people, including:
 Max Koch (1854–1925), Australian botanist
 Max Koch (academic) (1855–1931), German historian and literary critic
 Max Friedrich Koch, German history painter 
 Meinolf Koch (born 1957), retired German football player
 Michael Koch (disambiguation), several people, including:
 Michael Koch (born 1982), Swiss film director and screenwriter
 Michel Koch (born 1991), German track and road racing cyclist
 Mogens Koch (1898–1992), Danish architect
 Noppie Koch (1932–2010), Dutch cyclist and pacer
 Norma Koch (1898–1979), Academy Award winning costume designer
 Nynne Koch (1915–2001), Danish novelist and women's studies researcher
 Patrik Koch, Slovak ice hockey player
 Paulie Koch (born 1996), world champion wakeboarder
 Pauline Koch (1858–1920), Albert Einstein's mother
 Philippe Koch (born 1991), Swiss football defender
 Pete Koch (born 1962), American football player and actor
 Peter Koch (wood scientist) (1920–1998), American wood scientist and industrial engineer 
 Peter Rutledge Koch (born 1943), American artist book publisher, designer
 Pierre Koch (1895–1978), French engineer
 Pietro Koch (1918–1945), Italian police leader
 Polly Koch (1895–1976), American football player
 Pyke Koch (1901–1991), Dutch artist
 Raphael Koch (born 1990), Swiss footballer
 Richard Koch (born 1950), management consultant, entrepreneur, and writer
 Richard H. Koch (born 1852), American judge and railroad owner
 Rickard Koch (born 1976), Swedish bandy player
 Robert Koch (1843–1910), German physician, discoverer of the tubercle and cholera bacilli, Nobel Prize in Medicine laureate in 1905
 Robert Koch (footballer) (born 1986), German footballer
 Robert Koch Woolf (1923–2004), American interior decorator
 Robin Koch (born 1996), German footballer
 Roland Koch (born 1958), German politician
 Roland Koch (footballer) (born 1952), German football manager
 Roscoe R. Koch (1887–1963), American politician
 Rosslyn Koch (1886–?), Ceylonese politician
 Rudolf Koch (1876–1934), German calligrapher, typographic artist and teacher

S–Z
 Sam Koch, American football punter for the Baltimore Ravens of the NFL
 Sebastian Koch, German actor
 Silvana Koch-Mehrin, German politician
 Simona Koch (born 1968), German diver
 Simone Koch, German figure skater
 Shari Koch, German ice dancer
 Sophie Koch, French mezzo-soprano
 Stefan Koch (born 1964), German basketball coach
 Stefanie Koch (born 1981), German ski mountaineer
 Stephan W. Koch (born 1953), German theoretical physicist
 Theodor Koch, German engineer
 Thomas Koch (disambiguation), several people
 Thomaz Koch, Brazilian tennis player
 Tobias Koch (pianist), German pianist
 Tom Koch, writer for Mad Magazine
 Ursula Koch (born 1941), Swiss politician
 Valdemar Koch (1852–1902), Danish architect and politician
 Waldemar Koch, former German politician
 Walter Koch (disambiguation), several people, including:
 Walter Koch (Fallschirmjäger) (1910–1943), commander of the  during World War II
 Werner Koch (born 1961), German software author
 Wilhelm Daniel Joseph Koch (1771–1849), German physician and botanist
 Wilhelmina Koch (1845–1924), German composer

See also
 Koch (disambiguation)
 Koç (disambiguation)

References

Occupational surnames
German-language surnames
Dutch-language surnames